Teens in the Universe is a Soviet 1974 science fiction film directed by Richard Viktorov based on a script by Isai Kuznetsov and Avenir Zak about teens in the universe. Preceded by Moscow-Cassiopeia (first part, 1973).

Synopsis
The crewmembers of ZARYa starship supposed to mature during 27-year-long flight, appear at the Shedar system after less than one year of local time travel. Remote sensing verifies that one of the planets is very much Earth-like. Three of the crew members should land the new planet. They use the reconnaissance capsule and encounter the apparently abandoned planet. But the "extra" member of the crew Lobanov meets the strange more or less human-like creatures that escort him and his mates to the underground city. They become unreachable for radio communications.

During this link outage orbiting ZARYa rendezvous with another giant spaceship. The commander of that ship explains that their home planet is populated only by the two kinds of bionic robots - executors and far more advanced  rulers. These robots were invented two centuries ago, but after some period of good work, rulers tried to improve humans as well as the nature of the planet. Unfortunately, this "improvement" led to the total aloofness of the processed people, including suppression of love and reproductive behaviour. After a century and a half all population of the planet was dead. Only the space radio observatory station crew was unreachable for the robotic "care".

ZARYa crew sets up the second capsule to rescue the crew members captured by robots. Agapit, the son of the station commander, will be their guide in the underground city. After some troubles, boys counterfeit the recharging request from the power plant and burn up all robots at the planet, making it free for the space stationers.

Cast 
 Innokenti Smoktunovsky as I.O.O. (Extraordinary Service Executive)
 Lev Durov as academician Filatov
 Yuri Medvedev as academician Ogon-Duganovsky

Space ship Zarya crew 
 Mikhail Yershov as Vitya Sereda
 Aleksandr Grigoryev as Pasha Kozelkov
 Vladimir Savin as Misha Kopanygin
 Vladimir Basov Jr. as Fedya "Lob" Lobanov
 Olga Bityukova as Varya Kuteishchikova
 Nadezhda Ovcharova as Yulia Sorokina
 Irina Popova as Katya Panfyorova

Other cast 
 Vadim Ledogorov as Agapit
 Igor Ledogorov as Agapit's father
 Natalya Fateyeva as Pasha Kozelkov's mom
 Anatoly Adoskin as Pasha Kozelkov's dad
 Aleksandr Lenkov as Robot Executor
 Nikolai Pogodin as Robot Executor
 Raisa Ryazanova as Ludmila Okorokova
 S. Safonov as Robot Executor
 Nadezhda Semyontsova as Nadezhda Filatova
 Vladimir Shiryayev as Robot Executor
 Olga Soshnikova as Irina Kondratievna
 Aleksandr Vigdorov as Mikhail Kondratievitch
 Mikhail Yanushkevich as journalist
 Aleksandr Yanvaryov as brother of Pasha Kozelkov
 Aleksandr Zimin as Robot Executor
 Arkadi Markin as brother of Pasha Kozelkov before the flight (uncredited)
 Mikhail Yeremeyev as Robot Executor

Awards
 Prize for the Best Film for Kids and Youth of the All-Union Cinema Festival, Kishinev, 1975
 Special prize "Silver Asteroid" of the International Cinema Festival of Science Fiction Films, Triest, 1976
 Grand prize of the International Festival at Panama, 1976
 Vasilyev Brothers State Prize of the RSFSR (Russian Soviet Federative Socialist Republic) in the honour of Vasilyev brothers, 1977.

External links

1974 films
1970s Russian-language films
Soviet science fiction comedy films
1970s science fiction comedy films
Space adventure films
Russian science fiction comedy films
Gorky Film Studio films
1974 comedy films